Forvo.com  is a website that allows access to, and playback of, pronunciation sound clips in many different languages in an attempt to facilitate the learning of languages. Forvo.com was first envisioned in 2007 by co-founder Israel Rondón, and came to fruition in 2008. Forvo.com is owned by Forvo Media SL, based in San Sebastián, Spain. Forvo's 'About'-page states Forvo to be the largest pronunciation guide website on the Internet. It has been listed in the 50 best websites of 2013 by Time.

All sound clips on Forvo.com are created by its users, who also have the power to vote on each clip, positively or negatively, in an effort to ensure that the highest quality sound clips have priority in the site's listings. The pronunciations are also reviewed and edited by a volunteer team of editors.

Forvo has an API to share its pronunciation with other websites. The API service is paid (24 USD/year for individual use).

Recommendations for adding words
Forvo just encourages adding simple words but there are some exceptions that can be clearly found in their recommendations and policy.

Forvo License and User's Rights

Since the beginning of Forvo in 2008 the Company adopted a License called "Creative Commons BY-NC-SA 3.0". By the end of 2019 the Company removed the "Creative Commons" Terms and Conditions from their website. It was replaced with an "ad hoc" License that severely restricts user's rights to copy, modify and redistribute the audio files.

Since 2008 until 2019 Forvo requested volunteers to record their voices and approximately 5 million audios were recorded under the "Creative Commons BY-NC-SA 3.0". Afterwards, Forvo suddenly changed the License to make all recordings their exclusive property. Many users have complained of restrictions to download audio. Forvo tried to revoke the rights of users and impede them from downloading their own voices. 

More than 5 million audios were recorded under a Creative Commons License that grants irrevocable rights to users to obtain a copy, modify and redistribute the data. However, Forvo violated the Creative Commons License to restrict the freedom of users. In contrast, the Free and Open Source Alternative Lingua Libre does allow users to copy, modify and share their audios.

See also
 Lingua Libre
Common Voice

References

External links
 Forvo Website
 Deusto Reviewer on Language Resources
 "Open Channel" – Malaysia Star
  Google Translate: 
  Google Translate: 
  Google Translate: 
  Google Translate: 
 

Spanish educational websites
Internet properties established in 2008
Phonetics
Creative Commons-licensed websites